The 2021–22 Premiership Rugby Cup is the 49th season of England's national rugby union cup competition and the third under the new Premiership Rugby Cup format following the disbanding of the Anglo-Welsh Cup at the end of the 2017–18 season due to the withdrawal of the Welsh Pro14 regions.  Although there are no stipulations on player selection, the cup will be seen by many clubs as a development competition, and games will take place during the Autumn internationals and during the Six Nations.

The competition returns after a one-year hiatus due to cancellation of the 2020–21 competition. Sale Sharks enter the competition as reigning champions, becoming the second winners of the Premiership Cup when they defeated Harlequins 27–19 at the AJ Bell Stadium in the 2019–20 final.

Competition format
The competition consists of the thirteen Premiership Rugby teams arranged in three pools. Pool 1 will consist of five teams whilst pools B and C will consist of four. Each team will play each team in their pool once only and, in the case of pools 2 and 3, also play an additional inter pool match. There will be five rounds of matches meaning each team will receive one bye. The top team in each pool, plus the best overall runner-up, will progress to the semi-finals, with the highest ranked teams having home advantage. The winners of the semi-finals will then meet at the final in May 2022 to be held at the home ground of the highest ranked remaining team.

Teams

Pools

Pool 1

Pool 2

Pool 3

Fixtures

Round 1

Round 2

Round 3

Round 4

Round 5

Semi-final

Final

 Worcester were crowned champions due to having scored more tries than London Irish during the match

Notes

See also
 Premiership Rugby
 Anglo-Welsh Cup
 2021–22 RFU Championship Cup
 English rugby union system
 List of English rugby union teams
 Rugby union in England

References

Rugby union competitions in England
Premiership Rugby Cup
Premiership Rugby Cup